West Cornwall is an unincorporated village and census-designated place (CDP) in the town of Cornwall, Litchfield County, Connecticut, United States. It is on the west side of the town, on the east side of the Housatonic River, which forms the border with the town of Sharon. Connecticut Route 128 runs through the village, joining U.S. Route 7 across the Housatonic in Sharon.

West Cornwall was first listed as a CDP prior to the 2020 census.

References 

Census-designated places in Litchfield County, Connecticut
Census-designated places in Connecticut